Olga Olehivna Fridman (born 30 September 1998) is an inactive Ukrainian-Israeli tennis player and the 2015 female Israeli tennis champion.

As a junior, Fridman has a career-high world ranking of 12, achieved on 24 March 2014. Fridman has a career-high singles ranking of 231 by the WTA, achieved on 23 May 2016. She has won two ITF singles titles.

Early and personal life
Friedman was born to a wealthy family in Kyiv, the daughter of Ukrainian-Israeli oligarch Oleg Fridman. Although she represents Ukraine internationally, Fridman also holds Israeli citizenship.

Tennis career
Fridman has a career-high juniors ranking of 12, achieved on 24 March 2014.

Fridman made her WTA Tour main-draw debut at the 2015 Baku Cup in the doubles event, partnering Elizaveta Ianchuk.

She became the 2015 champion of Israel at the age of 17, beating world No. 126, Julia Glushko, 6–2, 6–2 in the final of the Israeli championship.

In December 2015, she had lived in Israel in recent years, and said: "I’d really like to represent Israel, but at the moment it depends on my parents. I really love the country and I believe it will eventually happen."

In January 2016, she made it to the final of the $25k event in Daytona Beach, where she was defeated by Tunisia's Ons Jabeur, 0–6, 6–2, 6–4.

The last tournament she played was a $25k event in Florida, in January 2017.

ITF finals

Singles: 4 (2–2)

Doubles: 1 (0–1)

References

External links
 
 

Ukrainian female tennis players
Israeli female tennis players
Ukrainian Jews
Jewish tennis players
1998 births
Living people
Sportspeople from Kyiv